Sadi (also Romanized as Sa‘dī) is a village in Abbas-e Sharqi Rural District, Tekmeh Dash District, Bostanabad County, East Azerbaijan Province, Iran. At the 2006 census, its population was 62, in 11 families.

References 

Populated places in Bostanabad County